Auguste-Siméon Garneray (1785 in Paris – 1824) was a French troubadour style painter.

Life
The second of three sons of the painter Jean-François Garneray, Auguste-Siméon studied under Jean-Baptiste Isabey and himself taught queen Hortense and later the duchesse de Berry. He also designed costumes for the Paris Opera. He produced the watercolours commissioned by empress Marie Louise for a Histoire de Mlle de La Vallière, along with the illustrations for an edition of Molière.

References
  beaux-arts and Noémi-Noire Oursel, Réunion des sociétés des beaux-arts des départements, vol. 27ème session : du 2 au 5 juin 1903, Ministère de l'instruction publique et des beaux-arts, Paris, 1903, partie Lectures et communications, chap. XXX (« Louis Garneray »), p. 608

1785 births
1824 deaths
19th-century French painters
French male painters
19th-century French male artists